Castle Court may refer to:

 CastleCourt, Belfast, a shopping centre 
 Castle Court School, Dorset, England